Angela Z. Monson (born July 31, 1955) is an American politician from Oklahoma who served in the Oklahoma State House of Representatives, representing District 99 from 1990–1993, as well as the Oklahoma Senate, representing District 48 from 1993–2005. In 2003, she became the first African American woman assistant majority floor leader in the Oklahoma legislature. Monson defeated incumbent Kirk Humphreys, a former Oklahoma City mayor, for the school board chairman's position in 2009, serving until 2013.

Although she had stated an intention to retire in 2018, she is currently employed by the Oklahoma University Health Sciences Center as Director of Health Policy Development and Analysis, as well as being Adjunct Associate Professor, Department of Family and Preventive Medicine. She is also a member of the OU Medical Center Board of Trustees (a hospital board) and is also a member of the Oklahoma City/County Board of Health.

Early life
Angela Monson was born on July 31, 1955, to parents Herman and Epron Monson in Oklahoma City. Monson was educated in Oklahoma City public schools and graduated from Douglass High School. Monson attended her first year at the University of Oklahoma (OU) on a President's Leadership Class scholarship. Since OU did not have the degree program she desired, Monson transferred to Oklahoma City University where she received her undergraduate degree in law enforcement corrections (criminal justice).

Career
After graduation, Monson worked as a probation/parole officer for the Oklahoma Department of Corrections in Shawnee, Oklahoma. After a year in Shawnee, Monson returned to Oklahoma City, where she worked with the Council for Resocialization of Ex-Offenders (CREO), a community corrections organization. While serving in this role, Monson decided she did not only want to implement the law, but instead wanted to help make the law. She returned to school and received her Master's of Science in public administration from the University of Oklahoma.

After graduation, Monson was hired as a traveling city manager for six primarily African-American towns in Oklahoma. Later she was hired as a fiscal analyst for the state legislature. Monson initially ran for office in 1984 but lost by a margin of approximately 132 votes to the incumbent. After her first campaign, she was out of a job and went to work for the Equitable Life Insurance Company selling insurance. In 1986, Monson was offered a job with the Oklahoma Health Care Campaign or the Oklahoma Healthcare Project, where she went on to become the executive director. Monson ran again for the Oklahoma House of Representatives in 1988 and was again unsuccessful in her campaign. Finally in 1990, Angela ran for the legislature again and was elected into the Oklahoma House of Representatives.

Political career
From 1990–1993, Monson served as a legislator in District 99. From 1993 to 2005, she served as an Oklahoma senator representing District 48,  which encompasses portions of northeastern Oklahoma County. In office, Monson sponsored many health care bills and was largely involved with the Oklahoma Healthcare Authority. In 1998, U.S. Secretary of Health Donna Shalala appointed Monson to the National Advisory Council to the National Health Service Corps, later appointing her as chair of the council until her term expired in 2002. From 2002–2003, she was the president of the National Conference of State Legislatures (NCSL), the first African-American woman to lead this organization. She also was the first African-American woman to fill the role of assistant majority floor leader in the Oklahoma legislature in 2003.

Senate committees
Chair of Education committee
Chair of Finance committee
Chair of the Appropriations Sub-committee on Group Health and Employee Benefits, and Appropriations 
Vice-Chair of the Sub-Committee on Health and Social Services

The Mental Health Parity Bill (1996)
Monson was nationally recognized for her involvement with the Mental Health Parity Act. She was the primary sponsor of a large portion of the legislation dealing with health care coverage in Oklahoma. With the Mental Health Parity Act, Monson strove to require inclusion of mental health benefits that were of the same dollar amount as medical or surgical benefits.

Post-political career
After her time in the senate, Monson became employed by the Oklahoma University Health Sciences Center as Director of Health Policy Development and Analysis. She is also a member of the OU Medical Center board of trustees, and the Oklahoma City/County board of health. Has planned to retire after 2018.

Achievements and service
 Executive Director of the Oklahoma Health Care Project (1986-1990)
 Member of the Pew Commission on Children in Foster Care
 Oklahoma Afterschool Network Chairperson 
Girl Scouts Redland Council Board of Directors member
 Legislative Health Champion Award by Blue Cross and Blue Shield of Oklahoma
Distinguished Legislator of the Year Award: American Psychiatric Association 
 Legislator of the Year: Oklahoma Public Employees Association, the Oklahoma Psychological Association, the Oklahoma Chapter of the National Association of Social Workers, and PHRMA
Advocate of the Year by the Families USA Foundation
University of Oklahoma College of Arts and Sciences Distinguished Alumnus Award 
Woman of the Year in Government by the Redlands Council of Girl Scouts
Oklahoma Child Advocacy's Children's Hall of Fame inductee
Friends of Children Award from the Oklahoma Association for the Education of Young Children
Recipient of the Silver Banner Award from the Tuscan government (2003)
Recognized by the Brazilian government for her work with women's rights in that country
Kate Barnard Award Recipient (2006)
Trustee of the Sickle Cell Cure Foundation

References

Other sources

Women of the Oklahoma Legislature Oral History Project -- OSU Library

1955 births
Living people
Politicians from Oklahoma City
African-American state legislators in Oklahoma
African-American women in politics
Democratic Party Oklahoma state senators
Women state legislators in Oklahoma
21st-century American politicians
21st-century American women politicians
Oklahoma City University alumni
University of Oklahoma alumni
21st-century African-American women
21st-century African-American politicians
20th-century African-American people
20th-century African-American women